Megaeupoa is a small genus of Asian jumping spiders first described by Y. J. Lin and S. Q. Li in 2020. It was not explicitly assigned to a position within the Salticidae, but the name Megaeupoa refers to the "evolutionary relationship" of the genus (Megaeupoa means 'large Eupoa').  it contains only two species: M. gravelyi and M. yanfengi.

See also
 Brettus
 Eupoa
 List of Salticidae genera

References

Further reading

Salticidae genera
Spiders of Asia